Ureibacillus composti is a Gram-positive, rod-shaped and thermophilic bacterium from the genus of Ureibacillus which has been isolated from livestock-manure compost from Ichon in South Korea.

References

Bacillales
Bacteria described in 2007